The 1990 King Cup was the 32nd season of the knockout competition since its establishment in 1956. Al-Hilal were the defending champions but they were eliminated by Al-Riyadh in the Round of 16. This season was the final season of the competition. The King Cup then returned under the name of King Cup of Champions in 2008.

Al-Nassr won their 6th title after defeating Al-Taawoun 2–0 in the final. By reaching the final Al-Taawoun became the second First Division side to reach the final after Al-Riyadh in 1978. As winners of the tournament, Al-Nassr qualified for both the 1991 Arab Cup Winners' Cup and the 1991–92 Asian Cup Winners' Cup.

Bracket

Note:     H: Home team,   A: Away team

Round of 16
The matches of the Round of 16 were held on 3 and 4 May 1990.

Quarter-finals
The matches of the Quarter-finals were held on 10 and 11 May 1990.

Semi-finals
The four winners of the quarter-finals progressed to the semi-finals. The semi-finals were played on 17 and 18 May 1990. All times are local, AST (UTC+3).

Final
The final was played between Al-Nassr and Al-Taawoun in the Youth Welfare Stadium in Jeddah. Al-Nassr were appearing in their 10th final while Al-Taawoun reached the final for the first time.

Top goalscorers

References

1990
Saudi Arabia
Cup